The ten Hagen Cottage–Stegeman Store, is a historic building located in Pella, Iowa, United States. A.J.C. and Charlotte ten Hagen were first generation immigrants from the Netherlands. The ten Hagen's received the title to this property, and the single-story frame cottage was built on it before A.J.C. died the following year. Charlotte inherited the property and was its owner until she sold it in 1876 to G.F. Stegeman who enlarged it and converted it into a general store. The building is located in what is known as Strawtown, the original business district in Pella. The building features heavy wood-frame construction, a six-bay, asymmetrical facade, side-gabled roof, a full-width front porch, and Dutch building techniques. The building techniques include a floor system where the flooring rests on top of the floor joists without the use of a subfloor, and window design that maximizes the amount of light into the structure. The building was listed on the National Register of Historic Places in 2008.

References

Houses completed in 1857
Pella, Iowa
Buildings and structures in Marion County, Iowa
National Register of Historic Places in Marion County, Iowa
Houses on the National Register of Historic Places in Iowa
Commercial buildings on the National Register of Historic Places in Iowa
Dutch-American culture in Iowa